The Militia of the United Kingdom were the military reserve forces of the United Kingdom of Great Britain and Ireland after the Union in 1801 of the former Kingdom of Great Britain and Kingdom of Ireland. The militia was transformed into the Special Reserve by the Territorial and Reserve Forces Act 1907. For the period before the creation of the United Kingdom, in the home nations and their colonies, see Militia (Great Britain).

Nineteenth century
A separate voluntary Local Militia was created in 1808 before being disbanded in 1816.

By 1813 the British Army was experiencing a shortage of manpower to maintain their battalions at full strength. Some consideration was given to recruiting foreign nationals; however on 4 November 1813 a bill was introduced to Parliament to allow Militia volunteers to serve in Europe. In the event only three battalions were raised, and these were sent to serve under Henry Bayly. On 12 April 1814 they arrived in Bordeaux, where they were attached to the 7th Division.

After the Napoleonic Wars, the Militia fell into disuse, although regimental colonels and adjutants continued to appear in the Army List. Whilst muster rolls were still prepared during the 1820s, the element of compulsion was abandoned. For example, the City Of York Militia & Muster Rolls run to 1829. They used a pre-printed form with a printer's date of Sept 1828.

The Militia was revived by the Militia Act of 1852, enacted during a period of international tension. As before, units were raised and administered on a county basis, and filled by voluntary enlistment (although conscription by means of the Militia Ballot might be used if the counties failed to meet their quotas). It was intended to be seen as an alternative to the army. Training was for 56 days on enlistment, then the recruits would return to civilian life but report for 21–28 days training per year. The full army pay during training and a financial retainer thereafter made a useful addition to the men's civilian wage. Of course, many saw the annual camp as the equivalent of a paid holiday. The militia thus appealed to agricultural labourers, colliers and the like, men in casual occupations, who could leave their civilian job and pick it up again. The militia was also a significant source of recruits for the Regular Army, where men had received a taste of army life. An officer's commission in the militia was often a 'back door' route to a Regular Army commission for young men who could not obtain one through purchase or gain entry to Sandhurst.

Under the Act, Militia units could be embodied by Royal Proclamation for full-time service in three circumstances:
 'Whenever a state of war exists between Her Majesty and any foreign power'.
 'In all cases of invasion or upon imminent danger thereof'.
 'In all cases of rebellion or insurrection'.

Until 1852 the militia were an entirely infantry force, but the 1852 Act introduced Militia Artillery units whose role was to man coastal defences and fortifications, relieving the Royal Artillery for active service. Some of these units were converted from existing infantry militia regiments, others were newly raised. In 1877 the militia of Anglesey and Monmouthshire were converted to Royal Engineers.

Under the reforms introduced by Secretary of State for War Hugh Childers in 1881, the remaining militia infantry regiments were redesignated as numbered battalions of regiments of the line, ranking after the two regular battalions. Typically, an English, Welsh or Scottish regiment would have two militia battalions (the 3rd and 4th) and Irish regiments three (numbered 3rd – 5th).

The militia must not be confused with the volunteer units created in a wave of enthusiasm in the second half of the nineteenth century. In contrast with the Volunteer Force, and the similar Yeomanry Cavalry, they were considered rather plebeian. Volunteer units appealed to better-off recruits as, unlike the Militia which engaged a recruit for a term of service, a volunteer could quit his corps with fourteen days notice, except while embodied for war or training with the regular forces. Volunteer Corps required recruits to fund their own equipment, however, effectively barring those with low incomes.

The Special Reserve

The militia was transformed into the Special Reserve by the military reforms of Haldane in the reforming post 1906 Liberal government. In 1908 the militia infantry battalions were redesignated as "reserve" and a number were amalgamated or disbanded. Numbered Territorial Force battalions, ranking after the Special Reserve, were formed from the volunteer units at the same time. Altogether, 101 infantry battalions, 33 artillery regiments and two engineer regiments of special reservists were formed.

Upon mobilisation, the special reserve units would be formed at the depot and continue training while guarding vulnerable points in Britain. The special reserve units remained in Britain throughout the First World War, but their rank and file did not, since the object of the special reserve was to supply drafts of replacements for the overseas units of the regiment. The original militiamen soon disappeared, and the battalions became training units pure and simple.

The Special Reserve reverted to its militia designation in 1921, then to Supplementary Reserve in 1924, though the units were effectively placed in "suspended animation" until disbanded in 1953.

The Militiamen

The term militiaman was briefly revived in 1939. In the aftermath of the Munich Crisis Leslie Hore-Belisha, Secretary of State for War, wished to introduce a limited form of conscription, an unheard of concept in peacetime. It was thought that calling the conscripts 'militiamen' would make this more acceptable, as it would render them distinct from the rest of the army. Only single men aged 20–22 were to be conscripted (given a free suit of civilian clothes as well as a uniform), and after six months full-time training would be discharged into the reserve. The first intake was called up, but the Second World War was declared soon afterwards, and the militiamen lost their identity in the rapidly expanding army.

Modern survivals
Two units still maintain their militia designation in the British Army, in the Army Reserve. These are the Royal Monmouthshire Royal Engineers (formed in 1539) and the Jersey Field Squadron (The Royal Militia Island of Jersey) (formed in 1337).

See also
 Fencibles

References

History of the British Army
Militia of the United Kingdom